Diglyphosa is a genus of flowering plants from the orchid family, Orchidaceae. It contains 3 known species, native to Southeast Asia, the eastern Himalayas, and New Guinea.

Diglyphosa celebica (Schltr.) Schltr. - Sulawesi
Diglyphosa elmeri Ames - Mindanao
Diglyphosa latifolia Blume - Yunnan, Assam, Bhutan, Malaysia, Borneo, Sumatra, Java, Maluku, Philippines, Sulawesi, New Guinea

See also 
 List of Orchidaceae genera

References 

  2005. Handbuch der Orchideen-Namen. Dictionary of Orchid Names. Dizionario dei nomi delle orchidee. Ulmer, Stuttgart
  (2006). Epidendroideae (Part One). Genera Orchidacearum 4: 134 ff. Oxford University Press.

External links 

Collabieae genera
Collabieae